René Osvaldo Rebolledo Salinas (born 22 September 1958) is a Chilean Roman Catholic prelate who currently serves as the Archbishop of La Serena since his appointment by Pope Francis on 14 December 2013. He had previously served as Bishop of Osorno.

Early life and education
René Osvaldo Rebolledo Salinas was born in Cunco, Chile, son of Bernardo Rebolledo and Berta Salinas. In March 1978, he entered Seminario Mayor San Fidel in San José de la Mariquina, Chile, where he studied philosophy and theology.  He was ordained to the priesthood on August 25, 1984 by Bishop Sixto Parzinger Foidl, O.F.M., Cap., who then served as Vicar Apostolic of Araucanía which later became the Roman Catholic Diocese of Villarrica.

Priesthood
After ordination, Rebolledo served at Immaculate Conception Parish in Loncoche, before commencing studies in Italy, where he earned a doctorate in theology.  Returning to Chile, from 1990 to 2002, he was a professor and formator at Seminario Mayor San Fidel.  From 1993 to 2002, he served as rector of the institution.

From 1994 to 2000, he served two terms as the president of Organization of Chilean Seminaries (Organización de Seminarios Chilenos, or OSCHI, for short), and he also served as a board member of the Latin American Organization for Seminaries (Organización Latinoamericana de Seminarios, or OSLAM).

In December 2002, Bishop Parzinger named him Vicar General of the newly erected Diocese of Villarrica.  In January 2004 he also became rector of the Cathedral.

Episcopate
Pope John Paul II named Rebolledo the Bishop of Osorno on May 8, 2004.  He was consecrated by Cardinal Francisco Javier Errázuriz Ossa, then the Archbishop of Santiago, on June 19, 2004.

In the Episcopal Conference of Chile, Rebolledo is the president of the Ecclesial Area, of the Episcopal Commission on Seminaries, and the National Liturgical Commission.

On December 14, 2013, Pope Francis named Rebolledo Archbishop of La Serena.

See also
Roman Catholicism in Chile

References

Living people
1958 births
People from Cautín Province
21st-century Roman Catholic bishops in Chile
21st-century Roman Catholic archbishops in Chile
Roman Catholic archbishops of La Serena
Roman Catholic bishops of Osorno